Euchrysops brunneus, the brown blue, is a butterfly in the family Lycaenidae. It is found in southern Ethiopia, Somalia, central and western Kenya and eastern Uganda. The habitat consists of savanna.

References

Butterflies described in 1923
Euchrysops